An analog signal is any continuous signal representing some other quantity, i.e., analogous to another quantity. For example, in an analog audio signal, the instantaneous signal voltage varies continuously with the pressure of the sound waves.

In contrast, a digital signal represents the original time-varying quantity as a sampled sequence of quantized values which imposes some bandwidth and dynamic range constraints on the representation.

The term analog signal usually refers to electrical signals; however, mechanical, pneumatic, hydraulic and other systems may also convey or be considered analog signals.

Representation
An analog signal uses some property of the medium to convey the signal's information. For example, an aneroid barometer uses rotary position as the signal to convey pressure information. In an electrical signal, the voltage, current, or frequency of the signal may be varied to represent the information.
   
Any information may be conveyed by an analog signal; such a signal may be a measured response to changes in a physical variable, such as sound, light, temperature, position, or pressure.  The physical variable is converted to an analog signal by a transducer.   For example, sound striking the diaphragm of a microphone induces corresponding fluctuations in the current produced by a coil in an electromagnetic microphone or the voltage produced by a condenser microphone.  The voltage or the current is said to be an analog of the sound.

Noise

An analog signal is subject to electronic noise and distortion introduced by communication channels, recording and signal processing operations, which can progressively degrade the signal-to-noise ratio (SNR). As the signal is transmitted, copied, or processed, the unavoidable noise introduced in the signal path will accumulate as a generation loss, progressively and irreversibly degrading the SNR, until in extreme cases, the signal can be overwhelmed. Noise can show up as hiss and intermodulation distortion in audio signals, or snow in video signals. Generation loss is irreversible as there is no reliable method to distinguish the noise from the signal.

In contrast, although converting an analog signal to digital form introduces a low-level quantization noise into the signal due to finite resolution of digital systems, once in digital form, the signal can be transmitted, stored, or processed without introducing significant additional noise or distortion.

Noise accumulation in analog systems can be minimized by electromagnetic shielding, balanced lines, low-noise amplifiers and high-quality electrical components.

In analog systems, it is difficult to detect when such degradation occurs.  However, in digital systems, degradation can not only be detected but corrected as well.

See also

 Amplifier
 Analog computer
 Analog device
 Analog signal processing
 Magnetic tape
 Preamplifier

References

Analog circuits
Electronic design
Television terminology
Video signal